The Never Ending Tour is the popular name for Bob Dylan's endless touring schedule since June 7, 1988.

Background
The Never Ending Tour 1992 started with a large tour of Oceania. Dylan had performed nineteen concerts in Australia and one in New Zealand. Dylan performed a total of seven concerts at the Sydney State Theatre and six concerts at the Melbourne Palais Theatre. The tour ended on April 18 in Auckland, New Zealand at the Mount Smart Stadium.

Shortly after completing his Oceania tour Dylan travelled to Hawaii where he performed two concerts before continuing on to perform twenty date tour of the United States. This tour included a seven show residency at Pantages Theatre in Los Angeles, California. Dylan also performed two concerts at The Warfield Theatre in San Francisco as well as two nights at the Berkley Community Theatre and two shows at the Paramount Theatre in Seattle, Washington. This leg of the tour came to an end on May 23 in Las Vegas, Nevada.

On June 26 Dylan started an eleven date European tour, his only European concerts of that year. Dylan performed in fairly unknown venues in fairly unknown cities. The tour ended in Juan-les-Pins, France on July 12.

Just over a month later, Dylan started another North American tour starting in Toronto, Ontario, Canada on August 17. During the tour Dylan performed a five show residency at the Orpheum Theatre in Minneapolis, Minnesota. The tour culminated in a performance at the Lafayette Performing Arts Center in Florida.

The Outburst of Consciousness Tour was the final leg of the 1992 Never Ending Tour. The tour started in Pittsburgh, Pennsylvania on October 9. There was a break in the tour after only five shows. During the break many major musical artists gathered at Madison Square Garden to recognise Bob Dylan's 30 years as a recording artist. Recorded on October 16, 1992, in New York City, the concert featured many artists performing classic Dylan songs, before ending with three songs from Dylan himself. The tour continued on October 23 and finally ending on November 15 at the South Florida show grounds in West Palm Beach, Florida.

Tour dates

Notes

References

External links

BobLinks – Comprehensive log of concerts and set lists
Bjorner's Still on the Road – Information on recording sessions and performances

Bob Dylan concert tours
1992 concert tours